The 2014 Pure Michigan 400 was a NASCAR Sprint Cup Series stock car race that was held on August 17, 2014, at Michigan International Speedway in Brooklyn, Michigan. Contested over 200 laps on the  superspeedway, it was the 23rd race of the 2014 NASCAR Sprint Cup Series. Jeff Gordon won the race, his third win of the season. Kevin Harvick finished second while Joey Logano, Paul Menard, and Dale Earnhardt Jr. rounded out the top five. The top rookies of the race were Austin Dillon (22nd), Cole Whitt (25th), and Alex Bowman (26th).

Previous week's race
A. J. Allmendinger held off a hard charging Marcos Ambrose with two laps to go to score his first career Sprint Cup Series victory in the Cheez-It 355 at The Glen at Watkins Glen International. Upon exiting his car, Allmendinger expressed his delight at the result, stating he could not "believe we've won a NASCAR Sprint Cup race", before congratulating his entire JTG Daugherty Racing team, expressing "with this whole 47 team, [team owners] Tad Geschickter, Jody Geschickter, Brad Daugherty, all the great sponsors we have, our first Cup victory together, my first victory...I love these guys. I just wanted it so bad for them and this team. They work so hard. I wasn't gonna let Marcos take that from me".

Report

Background

Opened in 1960, the track's turns are banked at eighteen degrees, while the 3,600-foot-long front stretch, the location of the finish line, is banked at twelve degrees. The back stretch, has a five degree banking and is 2,242 feet long. Michigan International Speedway has a grandstand seating capacity of 84,000 people. Joey Logano was the defending race winner from the 2013 race.

Following the events at Canandaigua Motorsports Park, Tony Stewart sat out the previous week's race at Watkins Glen and on August 14, Stewart-Haas Racing announced that Stewart would sit out Michigan and that Jeff Burton would drive in his place.

New rules and regulations
On the Friday before the race, NASCAR vice president of competition and racing development Robin Pemberton announced an amendment to the rules in response to Kevin Ward Jr.'s death at Canandaigua Motorsports Park. Pemberton stated that NASCAR were "formalizing rules that have been there", and that the new rule would be referred to, in section 9-16 (On-Track Incident Procedures) of the NASCAR Rulebook:

Per the rules, if a racecar is involved in an on-track incident and/or is stopped on or near the racing surface and unable to return to pit road, unless extenuating emergency conditions exist with the racecar (i.e. fire, smoke in cockpit, etc.) the driver should take the following steps:

 Shut off the electrical power and drop the window net to signal to safety crews that they are OK
 Do not loosen, disconnect or remove any driver personal safety equipment until directed to do so by safety personnel or a track worker
 After being directed to exit the racecar, the driver should proceed to either the ambulance, other vehicle, or as otherwise directed by safety personnel or a NASCAR/Track Official
 At no time should a driver or crew member(s) approach any portion of the racing surface or apron
 At no time should a driver or crew member(s) approach another moving vehicle

Pemberton also stated that "through time you have to recognize when you get a reminder or tap on the shoulder, something that may need to be addressed", and that "it's not just about NASCAR, but it's all of sports and motorsports that we take note in". Pemberton also noted that the penalties that would be handed down would be taken on a case-by-case basis and not a fixed one-size-fits-all penalty.

Entry list
The entry list for the Pure Michigan 400 was released on Tuesday, August 12, 2014 at 11:03 a.m. Eastern time. Forty-three drivers were entered for the race.

Practice

First practice

Qualifying
Gordon stated that he "knew that we were really strong here the last time we were here and what our team is doing right now it's just phenomenal how they continue to improve race cars and just the whole effort", and praised his team for his car setup as "you don't go around this place like that, that fast without a really good race car". Logano qualified on the front row for the seventh time in 2014, stating that his car was "able to get faster as the session went on which is just an awesome job by this team to give me cars like this every week that are so good and so fun to drive". Logano did express his frustration at having only one pole of the seven front row starts; expressing that his team "were close again and just weren't able to do it".

Martin Truex Jr. missed the first practice session and qualifying after Sherry Pollex, his longtime girlfriend and business partner, underwent surgery to treat her ovarian cancer. Matt Crafton filled in for him on Friday. Ryan Blaney practiced and qualified the No. 21 Ford for Wood Brothers Racing in place of Trevor Bayne, who was competing in the Nationwide Series event at Mid-Ohio. Bayne raced the car on Sunday.

Qualifying results

Practice (post-qualifying)

Second practice
Ryan Truex was involved in a hard wreck seven minutes into the second practice session; he lost control of his car, overcorrected and hit the wall head on in turn two.

Final practice

Race

Pre-race
Following his heavy practice crash, BK Racing driver Ryan Truex was taken to hospital, complaining about a headache and shoulder pain. He was later diagnosed with a concussion, and was replaced by J. J. Yeley for the race. Matt Crafton was originally slated to drive in Truex's place but he was unable to fit in the seat that was fitted for Truex. He later stated that he was "not going to take a chance", in light of his high positioning in the Camping World Truck Series points. With the driver change and a backup car – following the practice crash – Yeley started from the rear of the field. The race was scheduled to begin at 1:16 p.m. Eastern time but was delayed a few minutes to allow the Air Titans extra time to dry the race track.

First half

Start

Jeff Gordon led the field to the green flag, but was unable to hold the lead immediately, as Joey Logano took the lead on the opening lap. The caution flag flew for the first time on lap four after Kyle Busch hit the wall in turn one, following previous contact at turn four. The race restarted on lap eight, and was able to run cleanly until a competition caution, which had been necessitated following overnight rain showers. Ryan Newman stayed out when the leaders pitted so he assumed the lead. The race restarted on lap 25, but the caution flag flew almost immediately, after Danica Patrick started spinning in turn 1. Justin Allgaier, Michael Annett, Trevor Bayne, Matt Kenseth, Martin Truex Jr. and Yeley were all involved in the crash. Jimmie Johnson, who had stayed out along with Newman during the second caution, managed to move ahead of him prior to the yellow flag coming out, and thus assumed the lead.

The race restarted on lap 31, before debris in turn 2 brought out the fourth caution of the race on lap 37. Johnson elected to come onto pit road during the caution and Logano retook the lead for the restart, on lap 41. Logano held the lead for the next portion of the race, before Gordon took the lead on lap 56, with the help of the lapped car of Yeley. Gordon and Logano swapped the lead over the next couple of laps, before Gordon maintained the lead until his next pit stop, on lap 64. He handed the lead over to teammate Dale Earnhardt Jr. who kept the lead until lap 68, when he pitted and handed the lead to teammate Johnson. Johnson pitted on lap 76 and handed the lead back to Newman; Johnson rejoined the circuit a lap down in 25th place. Newman pitted on lap 79 and handed the lead back to Gordon. During this stint at the front – at the end of the 92nd lap – Gordon recorded his 1,000th lap led at Michigan races.

Second half
The caution flew for the fifth time on lap 97 after Kyle Larson blew a right-front tire and hit the wall in turn 4. Larson was disappointed at the end result stating it was "a shame" but stated that it fired up his impetus for a bid to make the Chase for the Sprint Cup. Newman stayed out when the leaders pitted so he retook the lead for the restart on lap 109. Logano retook the lead at the restart, and maintained the lead throughout a lengthy green-flag period of the race. Logano pitted on lap 140 and handed the lead to Kurt Busch, who himself held the lead for a few laps before his own pit stop. Gordon cycled through to the lead, holding it until his final stop, on lap 165. Busch led a lap before pitting, passing the lead to Brad Keselowski.

Finish
Just after he assumed the lead of the race, Keselowski hit the wall in turn 1 and brought out the sixth caution on lap 168, which resulted in Kasey Kahne taking the lead. Kahne pitted under the caution and Logano retook the lead for the restart, with 27 laps to go. Before the completion of a full lap of racing, the caution flags flew once again, when Brian Vickers got loose and spun in turn four. The race restarted with 23 laps to go. Kurt Busch got loose exiting turn two while battling Logano for the lead; his car started coming apart on the front stretch, hit the wall again in turn one and brought out the eighth caution of the race, as debris was scattered all over the track. The race restarted with 17 laps to go; Gordon took the lead from Logano and went on to win for the 91st time in his career. Gordon stated that he had "got a really good restart, and I got to his quarter panel in Turn 1 and I was able to drag him back and it allowed me to get the momentum and get by him". Logano felt he had Gordon cleared and lamented that he "should have pulled down in front of him".

Race results

Media

Race statistics
 20 lead changes among different drivers
 8 cautions for 37 laps
 Time of race: 2:49:16
 Jeff Gordon won his third race in 2014

Television

Radio

Standings after the race

Drivers' Championship standings

Manufacturers' Championship standings

Note: Only the first sixteen positions are included for the driver standings.

Notes

References

Pure Michigan 400
Pure Michigan 400
Pure Michigan 400
NASCAR races at Michigan International Speedway